Nine politicians have represented 50PLUS in the House of Representatives.

On 3 June 2014 the two members of 50PLUS, Martine Baay-Timmerman and Norbert Klein, split from each other, creating two factions. Both one-man factions claimed to represent 50PLUS, creating the factions fractie 50PLUS/Klein and fractie -50PLUS/Baay, although the party 50PLUS supported the latter. This situation ended when Klein renounced 50PLUS in the faction name on 12 November 2014.

List

Notes

References 

50PLUS